Gordon Abercrombie is an Australian former rugby league footballer who played in the 1960s. He played for the Cronulla-Sutherland of the New South Wales Rugby League premiership competition.

Playing career
Born in Sydney, New South Wales, Abercrombie originally signed to the Cronulla-Sutherland club in the mid-sixties as a quick and agile . Making his debut in the 1967 season it took him a year to cement himself as a regular first grader playing at fullback as opposed to being on the wings.

References

Rugby league players from Sydney
Cronulla-Sutherland Sharks players
Rugby league fullbacks
Year of birth missing (living people)
Living people